The Minnesota Department of Veterans Affairs (MDVA) is a state agency that provides services to current and former members of the United States military. The department provides care and housing through five veterans homes located in Fergus Falls, Hastings, Luverne, Minneapolis and Silver Bay. The department also assists veterans in obtaining healthcare, education, special veterans benefits and burials. The agency works with the United States Federal Veterans Administration Hospitals and Clinics including the Minneapolis VA Health Care System as well as coordination with the Minnesota National Guard and the American Legion.

Functions
The agency provides an important resources for veterans returning from war as well as retired military members who need health or other services that are provided by the government for their service to the state.

History
In 1887 the first state veterans home was created and funded by the legislature for military members returning from the US Civil War. It was called the Minnesota Soldiers' Home and its purpose was to provide health care and housing to former soldiers. An additional state agency called the Soldiers Welfare Bureau was created to administer special benefits for soldiers in 1925. Subsequently, the Soldiers Welfare Bureau was combined with the Minnesota Department of Veterans Affairs in 1943 by an act of the Minnesota Legislature. In 2007 the Minnesota Veterans Homes were placed under the administration of the Minnesota Department of Veterans Affairs.

In 2017-2018 a plan to expand the number of housing available was created and bonding dollars for a new home in Bemidji, Montevideo and Preston was created.

See also
 Minneapolis VA Health Care System

Notes

1943 establishments in Minnesota
Government agencies established in 1943
State agencies of Minnesota
State departments of veterans affairs in the United States